This is a list of ambassadors of the United States to Burma. In 1989 the military government of Burma changed the name of the nation to Myanmar, but the United States government—and all other Western governments—do not accept the name and still refer to the country as Burma in official usage.

Burma became a province of India in 1886 under the British Raj. The country was occupied by Japan during World War II but after the war, again came under control of Britain. In 1946 Britain began negotiations with the Burmese to establish independence for the nation, and reached a final agreement on January 27, 1947. A transitional government was established and Burma became fully independent on January 4, 1948.

The United States recognized Burma and established the Embassy of the United States, Rangoon on September 19, 1947, with Earl L. Packer as Chargé d'Affaires ad interim.

After 1990 the United States appointed no ambassador to Burma in protest against the policies of the military regime. A chargé d'affaires became the head of mission until 2012.

Ambassadors

Chargés d'Affaires
Franklin P. Huddle, Jr. (September 1990–September 1994)
Marilyn Meyers (September 1994–October 1996)
Kent M. Wiedemann (October 1996–May 1999)
Priscilla A. Clapp (July 1999–August 2002)
Carmen Maria Martinez (August 2002–August 2005)
Shari Villarosa (August 2005–September 2008)
Larry M. Dinger (September 2008–August 2011)
Michael Thurston (August 2011–July 2012)
Deb Lynn (December 17, 2022-)

Uncompleted appointments
Frederick Vreeland was nominated to the ambassadorial post by President George H. W. Bush in 1990, but the Senate declined to act on the nomination.
Parker W. Borg was nominated by President George H. W. Bush on July 22, 1991, but the Senate declined to act on the nomination.
Michael J. Green was nominated by President George W. Bush in 2008 to fulfill a special envoy position delegated by the Tom Lantos Block Burma JADE Act, but the nomination was not voted on by the end of the Bush Administration.

Notes

See also
Burma – United States relations
Foreign relations of Burma
Ambassadors of the United States

References
United States Department of State: Background notes on Burma

External links
 United States Department of State: Chiefs of Mission for Burma
 United States Department of State: Burma
 United States Embassy in Rangoon

 01
Myanmar
United States